The Victim (Chinese: 身不由已) is a 1980 Hong Kong martial arts comedy film directed by Sammo Hung and starring Hung and Bryan Leung. It was released in the US as Lightning Kung Fu in June 1982.

Although he had only a very small role in The Victim, former China Drama Academy student Yuen Biao played a key part in the making of this film. He was one of four action choreographers on the film, and doubled several of the stars for martial arts and acrobatics.

Karl Maka, a frequent co-star with Hung in such films as Skinny Tiger, Fatty Dragon and Odd Couple, has an unusual deadpan role as a Shaolin abbot.

Plot
Chun-yau (Bryan Leung) was adopted as a little orphan boy by a humble rich man under one rainy-night who already had a mean young son. Chun-yau has developed into a fine kung fu fighter who is on the run with his newly-wedded wife Yuet-yee (Fanny Wang) from his step-brother Cho-wing (Chang Yi), whom is madly after his sister-in-law. The jealous son holds a grudge against his stepbrother because he blames Chun-yau for the loss of his eye (and now wears a jade patch over the eye). Now, Cho-wing has made it his goal to hunt down Chun-yau and his bride, prompting the newlyweds to spend their lives together running in fear from the gang leader. One fine day, Fatty (Sammo Hung) spots Chun-yau helping an old man from being crushed by a loaded-cart. Fatty challenges Chun-yau but is ultimately defeated. However, Chun-yau is not interested in becoming Fatty's master since he is more worried about his own domestic problems. Apparently Fatty has promised his ancestors that he shall learn proper kung fu by training under the man who beats him (and Chun-yau is the first to do so.). However, Chun-yau and his wife are trying to keep a low profile and they want nothing to do with Fatty, as all he does is attract attention. Fatty, meanwhile, can't help but wonder why such a great martial artist lives in fear.

With his stepfather at death's door, Chun-yau and his wife go to pay final respects to his ill-struck adopted father. As Chun-yau enters his father's room, he finds himself surrounded by Cho-wing's men. They let Chun-yau speak with his stepfather as the old one expires. Cho-wing appears to be mourning the death of his father, but as soon as Chun-yau leaves his stepfather's room, Cho-wing orders his men to attack his stepbrother. Fatty arrives in time to help Chun-yau fight off the gang members. But Chun-yau's wife can no longer handle the pressures of life on the run and she begs Cho-wing to stop the violence and she will leave Chun-yau and live with him. Afterwards, she tells her husband she is sick of life on the run and that she will stay with Cho-wing. Chun-yau is shattered and leaves a broken man, followed by the faithful Fatty. But Yuet-yee really does not plan on spending her life with her hated admirer. After Cho-wing calls off the price on Chun-yau's head, Yuet-yee commits suicide rather than succumbing to his desires. After stealing the body of his wife and laying her to rest, Chun-yau finally begins training Fatty in the kung fu style his step father taught him, "The Iron Cross". During a training session, Fatty spots a gang member watching them from some tall grass so he tells his sifu and gets a knife to dispatch him. But to Chun-yau's surprise, Fatty stabs him instead, telling him that "He was a victim too".

Later, after the gang member reports back, Fatty goes and collects the bounty on Chun-yau from Cho-wing, who is also holding Fatty's mother hostage. With money and mother in hand, Fatty has one more gift for Cho-winfi, which is Chun-yau, whom very much alive. He explains that once Chun-yau became his sifu, he told him everything. They came up with the plan to stage his death and getting Fatty's mother released. But as Fatty and his mother were leaving, gang members stabbed them both. Fatty's last words to his teacher and friend was to put his loyalty to his step father aside and avenge them. A final battle ensues between a hired expert in the Southern Eagle Claw and Chun-yau. After Chun-yau dispatches the hired expert and gives the gang members a good beating, they got the message and left the two brothers to handle their own business. The two brothers are evenly matched in fighting style till Chun-yau finally lets go of his rage and turns the kung fu match into a street fight leaving Cho-wing dead from being hurled into a building support column.

Afterwards, Chun-yau paying respects at the graves of his wife and student. While there, a beggar looking a lot like Fatty shows up and asked about the deceased and their relations to him. As the beggar turns to leave, Chun-Yau realises who he is and runs after him.

Cast
Sammo Hung as Fatty Chan Wing
Bryan Leung as Leung Chun-yau
Chang Yi as Cho-wing
Fanny Wang as Yuet-yee
Peter Chan as Yuet-ming
Wilson Tong as Tong
Karl Maka as Shaolin Abbott Silver Lining
Chung Fat as Choi Fan-tan
Lay Kah as Henchman
Lau Chau-sang as Henchman
Lam Ching-ying as Cho-wing's cohort
Yuen Biao as Cho-wing's cohort
Billy Chan as Chun-yau's friend
Johnny Cheung as Cho-wing's man
Chow Kam-kong as Henchman
Shum Wai
David Wu
Dick Wei
Huang Ha
Wu Yuen

External links
 
 

1980 films
Hong Kong action comedy films
Hong Kong martial arts films
1990s action films
1980 martial arts films
Kung fu films
Hong Kong martial arts comedy films
1980s Cantonese-language films
Films directed by Sammo Hung
Hong Kong films about revenge
1990s Hong Kong films
1980s Hong Kong films